Dracula houtteana is a species of orchid.

External links 

houtteana